The Power of Conscience is a 1913 silent film short film directed by Theodore Wharton and starring Francis X. Bushman. It was produced by the Essanay Film Company and distributed through General Film Company.

Cast
Francis X. Bushman - Reverend Stanley Waters
Dorothy Phillips - Dora Gordon
Bryant Washburn - Byron Waters
Frank Dayton - Farmer Gordon
E. H. Calvert - Edward Hale
Helen Dunbar - Mrs. Waters
William Bailey - uncredited
Beverly Bayne - uncredited
Otto Breslin - uncredited

References

External links
The Power of Conscience at IMDb.com

1913 films
American silent short films
Films directed by Theodore Wharton
Essanay Studios films
American black-and-white films
1910s American films